Suprabha Beckjord (born 1956) is an ultramarathon runner from Washington, D.C. She is an owner of a gift shop and a disciple of Sri Chinmoy.

History 
In 1986, she began with a 7 km run. Her first Marathon was the Inspiration Marathon in Vermont. She progressed to multiday races, including seven-day races, and 1,300 mile races. She was the subject of a short documentary by Jessie Beers-Altman entitled 'The Spirit of a Runner' (2009).

Records 
The only woman to have completed every edition of the world's longest certified footrace, the Self-Transcendence 3100 Mile Race as winner until 2009.

Racing History

References

External links 
Video: The Spirit of a Runner Documentary

1956 births
Living people
Devotees of Sri Chinmoy
American female ultramarathon runners